The 1984 United States Senate election in Virginia took place on November 6, 1984. Incumbent Republican U.S. Senator John W. Warner won re-election to a second term. He handily defeated Edythe Harrison, the first woman in Virginia nominated by the Democratic Party for statewide office.

Candidates

Democratic
 Edythe C. Harrison, member of the Virginia House of Delegates

Republican
 John W. Warner, incumbent Senator

Results

See also 
  1984 United States Senate elections

References

Virginia
1984
1984 Virginia elections